Murray Edwards College is a women-only constituent college of the University of Cambridge. It was founded in 1954 as New Hall. In 2008, following a donation of £30 million by alumna Ros Edwards and her husband Steve, it was renamed Murray Edwards College, honouring its first President, Rosemary Murray and the donors.

History

New Hall was founded in 1954, housing sixteen students in Silver Street where Darwin College now stands.  Cambridge then had the lowest proportion of women undergraduates of any university in the United Kingdom and only two other colleges (Girton and Newnham) admitted female students. 

In 1962, members of the Darwin family gave their home, "The Orchard", to the College. This new site was located on Huntingdon Road, about a mile from the centre of Cambridge. The architects chosen were Chamberlin, Powell and Bon, who are known for their design of the Barbican in London, and fundraising commenced. The building work began in 1964 and was completed by W. & C. French in 1965. The new college could house up to 300 students.

In 1967, one of the college's PhD students, Jocelyn Bell Burnell, a researcher in the university radio astronomy group, discovered the first four pulsars, leading to a Nobel Prize for her supervisor and ultimately, for Bell Burnell herself, a position as a research professor at the University of Oxford.

In 1975, the college's President Rosemary Murray became the first woman to hold the post of vice-chancellor of the University of Cambridge. Two subsequent presidents, Anne Lonsdale and Jennifer Barnes, have become pro-vice-chancellors of the University.

Following a 2005 donation of £30 million by alumna Rosalind Edwards and her husband Steve Edwards to secure its future, in early 2008 New Hall was renamed Murray Edwards College, honouring the first President, Dame Rosemary Murray and the benefactors. There was some opposition to this as the new name incorporated a man's surname, despite the college being reserved for women students. Ros Edwards had attended the college in the 1980s and made a fortune with her partner when their software company Geneva Technology was sold to Convergys in 2001.

Men-only Cambridge colleges were converted into mixed-sex colleges in the 1970s and 1980s. Since the 2006 announcement that the University of Oxford's last remaining women-only college, St Hilda's, would also admit men, Cambridge is the only United Kingdom university that partially maintains a female-only student admissions policy, represented by Newnham, Murray Edwards, and until October 2021, Lucy Cavendish College. The fellowship and staff at Murray Edwards College are recruited from all genders. There is no bar to male students frequenting the college and many are taught there by Murray Edwards' fellows.

Arms and logo
New Hall received its Royal Charter in 1972. The Arms of the college are emblazoned as follows:

Sable a Dolphin palewise head downwards to the dexter in chief three Mullets fesswise a Bordure embattled Argent

In plain English, this means: on a black background, place the following features in silver. Vertically in the centre, place a dolphin with head downwards to the left. On top, place three stars horizontally across. Bordering the arms, place a square wave representing the battlements of a castle.

The black castellation round the arms marks the college's location on Castle Hill. The three stars are borrowed from the Murray coat of arms, while the heraldic dolphin symbolises a youthful spirit of exploration and discovery, and a kindly intelligence.

The college had designed a new logo to mark its transition from New Hall to Murray Edwards College. It was based on the design of the interior of the dining hall (the "Dome") and was called the 'spark'. However, on consultation with its alumnae, the college decided to continue to use its arms in official materials.

Buildings
Like many of the other Cambridge colleges, Murray Edwards College was not built all at one time but expanded as the need arose, over several time periods. The college therefore has several accommodation blocks of differing styles. In order of construction:
 Orchard Court (also known as Old Block) recalls the name of the grounds now occupied by the college, which was The Orchard, a large house part-owned by Norah Barlow, granddaughter of Charles Darwin. It is divided into the Wolfson, Nuffield and Spooner Wings, named after donors to New Hall during its first few decades. Part of the original structure was designed in the 1960s and completed in 1965. In 2009, part of this block was refurbished to improve fire safety and living standards. Some student rooms are split across two levels, meaning they have a bedroom upstairs and a separate living space downstairs. Many of the rooms have access to a shared balcony. 
 Pearl House (formerly known as New Block), named after Valerie Pearl, the second president of the college. The building was constructed with funding from the Kaetsu Foundation. All rooms are en suite. Wheelchair access is available to each floor via the central lift. Opened in 1994, this is where first year undergraduates are accommodated. Unlike most colleges at Cambridge, the building offers fully equipped kitchens, baths and a lift. 
 Buckingham House. The current building was a replacement for another building of the same name that stood on this site, and was opened in 2001. All rooms are en suite. The building is wheelchair accessible and has a lift. Contains a 142-seat auditorium which is used for lectures, film festivals and concerts.
 Canning and Eliza Fok House is named after the Hong Kong entrepreneur Canning Fok and his wife Eliza Fok, who donated the funds for constructing this accommodation block. All rooms are en suite. The building is wheelchair accessible and has a lift. Opened in 2008. Canning and Eliza Fok House is specifically built to accommodate the growing population of graduate students at Murray Edwards, and has a large shared kitchen/living area between 8 bedrooms. 
The first buildings of the college on Huntingdon Road were designed by the architects, Chamberlin, Powell and Bon, and are listed Grade II* (particularly important buildings of more than special interest). This includes:
 The Dome, which features some of the artwork the college is famed for, as well as a rising servery (a bar that rises from the floor for special events). This is where the cafeteria is located. Students take their meals here, including Saturday and Sunday brunch, often cited as the best brunch in Cambridge. Formals are held here, once a week on a Tuesday. 
 Fountain Court, which can be accessed from the bar and looks into the library, and features an illuminated fountain and waterways. Tables and chairs are put out there in warmer months as well as displays of flowers. 
 The Library, which was designed to reflect the interior of a Cathedral. Students can request heaters, blankets, tea, coffee and biscuits as they study. Yoga sessions, arts and craft and a variety of other welfare events are held here and it is open 24/7.

Gardens
The college gardens have an informal style, initially planned and planted by the first president, Dame Rosemary Murray. The gardens include a greenhouse originally belonging to the estate of the Darwin family, where banana plants are grown during the winter months.

In 2007, Murray Edwards College (then New Hall) became the first Cambridge College to participate in the RHS Chelsea Flower Show. The theme of the presented garden was the Transit of Venus, and was awarded a Bronze Flora medal in the Chic Garden Category. After the show, this garden was recreated in a slightly larger form beside the library.

As part of the Cambridge tradition of May Week, the college hosts an annual garden party that is popular with students from across the university. The garden party features a new theme each year and is well received by those in attendance. In Michaelmas (the Autumn/ Winter term), the college celebrates 'Apple Day' in the gardens, a day of autumnal activities such as apple picking, cooking, crafting and bonfires. 

The students at Murray Edwards are encouraged to enjoy the gardens and walk on the lawns, meaning it is common to spot students sunbathing, studying, taking picnics or even relaxing on the small beach that is erected in the Summer. The gardens are maintained by professional staff, and recently also by fellows and students. Since 2012, gardening allotments have been provided for fellows, undergraduates and postgraduates for growing herbs and vegetables, in addition to the flowers and herbs already planted by the gardeners.

Studentships
The college maintains a fund for graduate research, including the Stephan Körner graduate studentship for studies in philosophy, classics or law.

Women's Art Collection

Murray Edwards is home to the Women's Art Collection (known until 2022 as the New Hall Art Collection), the largest collection of women's art in Europe, and the second largest in the world (the largest being the National Museum of Women in the Arts in Washington, D.C.).

The artwork can be seen throughout College, and students are encouraged to request pieces to be brought into their bedrooms as decoration. 

The New Hall Art Collection was started in the early 1990s, when New Hall had few pieces of art and most of them were portraits of old gentleman. The college president wrote to 100 women artists and asked each to donate one piece of art, and more than 75% of the artists approached agreed to give a piece of work. Donations have continued since, and the Art Collection now contains work by many famous women artists, including:
 Gillian Ayres
 Fiona Banner
 Wilhelmina Barns-Graham
 Sandra Blow
 Helaine Blumenfeld
 Judy Chicago
 Eileen Cooper
 Tracey Emin
 Mary Fedden
 Elisabeth Frink
 Guerrilla Girls
 Maggi Hambling
 Barbara Hepworth
 Nicola Hicks
 Lubaina Himid
 Chantal Joffe
 Mary Kelly (artist)
 Cornelia Parker
 Emily Patrick
 Barbara Rae
 Gwen Raverat
 Paula Rego
 Shani Rhys James
 Bridget Riley
 Cindy Sherman
 Julia Sorrell
 Jo Spence
 Rose Wylie

Presidents

New Hall
1964–1981: Rosemary Murray
1981–1995: Valerie Pearl
1996–2008: Anne Lonsdale

Murray Edwards College
2008–2012: Jennifer Barnes
2012–2013: Ruth Lynden-Bell (acting)
2013–2021: Barbara Stocking
2021-present: Dorothy Byrne

Notable alumnae

 Manel Abeysekera, diplomat 
 Baroness Haleh Afshar, professor in politics and women's studies at the University of York
 Gina Barreca, professor of English literature at the University of Connecticut, author
 Dame Jocelyn Bell Burnell, astrophysicist who discovered the first four pulsars
 Helen Cooper, literary scholar
 Sarah Coakley, theologian and philosopher
 Liv Garfield, chief executive of Severn Trent Water and youngest female CEO of a FTSE 100 company.
 Amika George, activist and founder of the #FreePeriods campaign against period poverty
 Roma Gill, academic and literary scholar
 Jane Heal, philosopher, Emeritus Professor
 Angela Hobbs, philosopher, and Professor of the Public Understanding of Philosophy at the University of Sheffield
 Mishal Husain, newsreader for BBC News
 Julia King, engineer and former Vice-Chancellor, University of Aston
 Clare Lawrence, actress
 Helen Macdonald, prize-winning author of H is for Hawk
 Joanna MacGregor, concert pianist, conductor, and composer
 Philippa Marrack, immunologist known for her T cell research
 Hattie Morahan, actress
 Elizabeth Norton, writer and historian
 Maggie O'Farrell, winner of the 2020 Women's prize for fiction. 
 Sue Perkins, comedian
 Dame Jessica Rawson, art historian, former Warden of Merton College, Oxford
 Josie Rourke, artistic director of the Donmar Warehouse and film director
 Susan Sherratt, archaeologist
 Elizabeth Slater, Professor of Archaeology at the University of Liverpool
 Dame Barbara Stocking, Director of Oxfam, former president of the college (elected in 2013)
 Tilda Swinton, Academy Award-winning actress
 Carina Tyrrell, British-Swiss public health physician and former Miss United Kingdom of Miss World
 Frances Vernon, novelist
 Nicola Walker, actress
 Claudia Winkleman, TV presenter and journalist
 Vicki Young, Chief Political Correspondent of BBC News

See also
 Alumni of New Hall, Cambridge
 Fellows of Murray Edwards College, Cambridge
 Murray Edwards College Boat Club

References

External links

Official website

 
Colleges of the University of Cambridge
Women's universities and colleges in the United Kingdom
 
Educational institutions established in 1954
1954 establishments in England
Domes